Gabriel Dobre (born 14 April 1980), is a Romanian futsal player who plays for Győri ETO and the Romanian national futsal team.

References

External links
UEFA profile

1980 births
Living people
Romanian men's futsal players